Chōyū Sekai is a web manhua published by Tencent. A Chinese-Japanese animated series based on the manhua aired in China and Japan from 12 January 2017 to 8 June 2017. Success and Asahi Production co-produced the anime adaptation.

Characters
Noii

Motis

Cass 

Haki 

Vinsen 
 
Keikan 
 
Ryū-sensei 
 
Chinnō 
 
Hakū 

Mōnsuto

Viros

References

External links
Official manhua website 

Tencent manhua
Chinese animated television series
Animated series based on comics
Chinese webcomics
2010s webcomics
2017 Chinese television series debuts
Television shows based on webcomics
Television shows based on manhua
Manhua adapted into television series
2017 anime ONAs